Cassibile may refer to:

 Cassibile (village), a village and frazione of the comune of Syracuse, Sicily
 Armistice of Cassibile, armistice between Italy and the Allies of World War II 
 Cassibile (river), a river of the province of Syracuse, in Sicily
 Cassibile, archaeological site (Bronze-Iron Ages)